The moth family Zygaenidae includes the following genera:

Achelura
Acoloithus
Adscita
Aeacis
Aethioprocris
Agalope
Aglaino
Aglaope
Agrumenia
Agrumenoidea
Allobremeria
Allocaprima
Allocyclosia
Alloprocris
Alophogaster
Alteramenelikia
Alterasvenia
Amesia
Amuria
Anarbudas
Ancistroceron
Ankasocris
Anthilaria
Aphantocephala
Arachotia
Araeocera
Arbudas
Artona
Astyloneura
Atelesia
Balataea
Barbaroscia
Biezankoia
Bintha
Birtina
Boradia
Boradiopsis
Brachartona
Bremeria (moth)
Burlacena
Cadphises
Callizygaena
Callosymploca
Campylotes
Canerkes
Caprima
Cerodendra
Chalconycles
Chalcophaedra
Chalcosia
Chalcosiopsis
Chilioprocris
Chrysartona
Chrysocaleopsis
Cibdeloses
Cirsiphaga
Clelea
Clematoessa
Cleoda
Codane
Coelestina
Coelestis
Coementa
Collestis
Corma
Cryptophysophilus
Cyanidia
Cyclosia
Devanica
Didina
Docleomorpha
Docleopsis
Dubernardia
Elcysma
Ephemeroidea
Epiorna
Epizygaena
Epizygaenella
Epyrgis
Erasmia
Erasmiphlebohecta
Erythroclelea
Eterusia
Euclimaciopsis
Eucorma
Eucormopsis
Eumorphiopais
Euphacusa
Eusphalera
Eutychia
Euxanthopyge
Formiculus
Formozygaena
Funeralia
Gaedea
Gingla
Goe
Gonioprocris
Gregorita
Gynautocera
Hadrionella
Hampsonia
Harrisina
Harrisinopsis
Harrisinula
Hedina
Hemichrysoptera
Hemiscia
Herpidia
Herpolasia
Hestiochora
Hesychia
Heteropan
Heteropanula
Heterusinula
Histia
Hoerwertneria
Homophylotis
Huebneriana
Hysteroscene
Illiberis
Inope
Inouela
Isbarta
Ischnusia
Isocrambia
Jordanita
Klaboana
Kubia
Kublaia
Lamprochloe
Laurion
Leptozygaena
Levuana
Lictoria
Lophosoma
Lucasiterna
Lycastes
Madaprocris
Malamblia
Malthaca
Mesembrynoidea
Mesembrynus
Metanycles
Milleria
Mimascaptesyle
Mimeuploea
Monalita
Monoschalis
Morionia
Mydrothauma
Naufockia
Neoalbertia
Neobalataea
Neofelderia
Neoherpa
Neoilliberis
Neoprocris
Neopryeria
Neurosymploca
Notioptera
Onceropyga
Opisoplatia
Orna
Pampa
Panherpina
Parasyntomis
Peristygia
Pernambis
Peucedanophila
Phauda
Phaudopsis
Philopator
Phlebohecta
Piarosoma
Pidorus
Pintia
Platyzygaena
Pollanista
Pollanisus
Pompelon
Praeprocris
Praezygaena
Praviela
Primilliberis
Procotes
Procris
Procrisimilis
Procrita
Prosopandrophila
Pryeria
Psaphis
Pseudarbudas
Pseudonyctemera
Pseudoprocris
Pseudoscaptesyle
Pseudosesidia
Pteroceropsis
Pycnoctena
Pyromorpha
Reissita
Retina
Rhagades
Rhodopsona
Rjabovia
Roccia
Saliunca
Saliuncella
Santolinophaga
Sciodoclea
Scotopais
Seryda
Sesiomorpha
Setiodes
Silvicola
Soritia
Sthenoprocris
Stylura
Subclelea
Syringura
Tascia
Tasema
Tetraclonia
Thaumastophleps
Theresimima
Thermophila
Thibetana
Thyrassia
Thyrina
Tremewania
Triacanthia
Triprocris
Trypanophora
Turneriprocris
Urodopsis
Usgenta
Vogleria
Wiegelia
Xenares
Xenoprocris
Yasumatsuia
Zama
Zeuxippa
Zikanella
Zutulba
Zygaena
Zygaenites
Zygaenoprocris

References
Natural History Museum Lepidoptera Genus Database

 List
Zygaenid